Thomas J. Dolan (January 10, 1855 – January 16, 1913) was a player in Major League Baseball. Dolan was primarily a catcher, but also played outfield, third base, and pitched four innings.

References

External links

1855 births
1913 deaths
Baseball players from New York (state)
Major League Baseball catchers
Chicago White Stockings players
Buffalo Bisons (NL) players
St. Louis Browns (AA) players
St. Louis Maroons players
Baltimore Orioles (NL) players
Pittsburgh Allegheny players
Buffalo (minor league baseball) players
Omaha Green Stockings players
Utica Pent Ups players
Springfield (minor league baseball) players
San Francisco Athletics players
San Francisco Knickerbockers players
New York New Yorks players
Brooklyn Grays (Interstate Association) players
Lincoln Tree Planters players
St. Louis Whites players
Denver Grizzlies (baseball) players
Denver Mountaineers players
Lincoln Rustlers players
Des Moines Prohibitionists players
Portland Webfeet players
Oakland Morans players
San Antonio Missionaries players
19th-century baseball players
Burials at Calvary Cemetery (St. Louis)